Kuhan may refer to:
Alyaksandr Kuhan (b. 1991), Belarusian footballer
Kuhan, Iran (disambiguation), places in Iran